Smoothie King Center (locally referred to as SKC) is a multi-purpose indoor arena in New Orleans, Louisiana. It is located in the city's Central Business District, adjacent to Caesars Superdome. The arena opened in 1999 as New Orleans Arena and has been home to the New Orleans Pelicans of the National Basketball Association (NBA) since 2002. The New Orleans VooDoo of the Arena Football League played their home games in the arena from 2004 until the team disbanded in 2008. The VooDoo resumed play at the arena in March 2011, until after the 2015 AFL season when the franchise folded.

Arena information
The arena was completed in 1999 at a cost of $114 million and officially opened on October 19, 1999. The arena seats 17,805 for concerts, 16,867 for Pelicans games, 18,500 for college basketball and Pelicans playoff games, and 16,900 for ice hockey and arena football. It has 2,800 club seats and 56 luxury suites.

The arena as a concert venue can seat 7,500 for half-stage shows, 17,221 for end-stage shows and 17,805 for a center-stage shows. For trade shows and conventions the arena features  of space. The ceiling is 65 feet (20 m) to beam and roof, 70 feet (21.5 m) to the top of the arena.

History

In 1999, the arena's first tenant, the New Orleans Brass ice hockey team of the ECHL played their first home game in the arena. The team played in the arena their last three seasons.  When the New Orleans Hornets arrived in 2002, they persuaded the state government to demand that the Brass foot the cost of converting the arena between basketball and hockey configurations.  That expense was more than the Brass were willing to pay, and they were forced to fold due to the lack of another suitable arena.

The Hornets played their first game at the Smoothie King Center versus the Utah Jazz on October 30, 2002.

The New Orleans VooDoo, of the Arena Football League (AFL), began playing their home games in the arena starting in February 2004.

Following Hurricane Katrina on August 29, 2005, medical operations that had previously been housed in the Superdome were moved to the Arena. Medical personnel had been working in an area of the Superdome with poor lighting, leaking ceilings and soggy carpet. The Arena's design was tested in 1996 by CPP, a wind engineering consulting firm, so it fared far better than the Superdome during the storm and was in better condition to house sensitive medical operations.  Thus, unlike the Superdome, the Arena reopened to activities only one month after the storm. On March 8, 2006, the Hornets played their first home game at the arena since Hurricane Katrina and the start of the 2005–06 season. A sellout crowd of 17,744 watched the Los Angeles Lakers defeat the Hornets, 113–107.

In 2006, the arena installed an LED centerhung video and scoring system from Daktronics out of Brookings, South Dakota. The centerhung installation is made up of two ring displays and eight video displays, as well as scoreboards. In the summer of 2008, new Daktronics "see through" shot clocks were installed, replacing the existing box units.

The New Orleans VooDoo of the Arena Football League resumed play at the arena in March 2011.

In 2013, the arena underwent a significant upgrade. The 2013 renovations were primarily focused for the gameday experience inside the arena. These upgrades include updates to the Suites and Club Levels, expanding the Club Levels, Creating new Loge Boxes, and a new Party Perch. Other upgrades include upgraded concession stands, upgraded LED boards, and other in-house amenities for the teams and performers that use the arena.

On February 5, 2014, it was announced that a 10-year agreement was reached to rename New Orleans Arena the Smoothie King Center prior to the 2014 NBA All-Star Game.

In September and October 2014, exterior renovations were made to the Smoothie King Center, including new entrances, painting the center from bluish green to light gray, and a new outer LED lighting system similar to the Mercedes-Benz Superdome's own. However, some original plans, such as to add an overhang to the building, were cancelled.

The Hornets/Pelicans have enjoyed a winning record of 341–275 during the regular season and 15–9 during the playoffs in home games played at the New Orleans Arena/Smoothie King Center as of the conclusion of the 2018–19 season.

Seating capacity
The seating capacity for NBA basketball games has gone:

Notable events

Sports

NBA
Smoothie King Center has hosted the 2008 NBA All-Star Game, the 2014 NBA All-Star Game, and the 2017 NBA All-Star Game, after the NBA pulled the game from Charlotte's Spectrum Center due to North Carolina's "bathroom bill."

College sports
In 2011, the arena hosted the Southeast Regional of the NCAA Division I men's basketball tournament. The arena also hosted the first and second rounds of the NCAA men's basketball tournament in 2007 and 2010.

The 2012 Southeastern Conference men's basketball tournament was held at the arena.

The arena hosted the 2004 Women's Final Four and 2013 Women's Final Four. It has also hosted the 2008 NCAA women's basketball tournament South Regionals. The arena was set to host the 2020 Women's Final Four, before it was eventually canceled due to the ongoing coronavirus pandemic.

The 2002 NCAA Division I Women's Volleyball Final Four was held at the New Orleans Arena in December 2002.

The 2019 SEC gymnastics championships were held at the arena.

Arena football
The arena hosted ArenaBowl XXI in 2007, ArenaBowl XXII in 2008 and ArenaBowl XXV in 2012.

MMA and boxing
 September 9, 2000 – The arena hosted the light heavyweight title fight between Roy Jones Jr. and Eric Harding. Jones won by TKO in the 10th round.
 June 6, 2015 – UFC Fight Night: Boetsch vs. Henderson

Other events
 2000 – The Professional Bull Riders (PBR) Bud Light Cup tour event
 2001 – Professional Bull Riders (PBR) Bud Light Cup tour event
 2002 – Professional Bull Riders (PBR) Bud Light Cup tour event was held in the arena.
 2003 – Professional Bull Riders (PBR) Built Ford Tough Series tour event
 August 2003 – The Bassmaster Classic XXXIII weigh-in was held in the arena.
 March 2007 – The Professional Bull Riders (PBR) Built Ford Tough Series tour event was held in the arena.
 April 2010 – The Professional Bull Riders (PBR) event was held in the arena for a Built Ford Tough Series event.
 March 2015 - AMSOIL Arenacross
 November 2019; February 2022 - Hot Wheels Monster Trucks Live

Professional wrestling
The arena has also hosted various WWE events, including Royal Rumble in 2001, Extreme Rules in 2009, Hell in a Cell in 2011, Elimination Chamber in 2013, the 2014 WWE Hall of Fame induction ceremony and the following Raw as part of WrestleMania XXX weekend, and NXT TakeOver: New Orleans, the 2018 WWE Hall of Fame induction ceremony, and the following Raw and SmackDown events as part of WrestleMania 34 weekend. The arena has also hosted various Raw and SmackDown shows.

See also
Champions Square
Sports in New Orleans

Gallery

References

External links

Official website

1999 establishments in Louisiana
Basketball venues in New Orleans
Boxing venues in New Orleans
College basketball venues in the United States
College volleyball venues in the United States
Convention centers in Louisiana
Defunct indoor ice hockey venues in the United States
Gymnastics venues in New Orleans
Indoor arenas in Louisiana
Indoor arenas in New Orleans
Mixed martial arts venues in Louisiana
Music venues in Louisiana
National Basketball Association venues
New Orleans Brass arenas
New Orleans Hornets venues
New Orleans Pelicans venues
New Orleans VooDoo
Rodeo venues in the United States
Sports venues completed in 1999
Tulane Green Wave basketball venues
Tulane Green Wave men's basketball
Volleyball venues in New Orleans